The Church of St. Felix is a Roman Catholic church located in the district of Hauts-Pavés/Saint Felix, in Nantes, France. The church is dedicated to the fifth century French bishop, Felix of Nantes.

History

Before its creation, the current St. Felix parish was part of the village of Barbin, and it adjoined St. Similien parish.

The church was built from August 1843 on the land bordering the château de la Haute-Forêt, with plans by architect Charles Raymond (1813–1872). In a Gothic Revival style and with a small scale. Once completed, the small rural church was extended and dedicated to Monsignor  on 25 February 1844. At the time, the vault was not completely finished and the floor was not paved.

In 1856, the Ministry of Interior offers a memorial for Olivier Saint-Félix converting the Saxons, and added two wings to the nineteenth-century building. The church was enlarged again around 1950 and consecrated on 20 June 1953. All the windows are works of Gabriel Loire.

Organs
The great organ of Saint-Félix church date from 1954 and was inaugurated by Maurice Duruflé. They were later restored by organ-builder Denis Lacorre in 2008.

References

See also
 Église Saint-Similien

Roman Catholic churches in Nantes